The National Gallery (Ethniki Pinakothiki) is an art museum located on Vasilissis Sofias avenue in the Pangrati district, Athens, Greece. It is devoted to Greek and European art from the 14th century to the 20th century. 

The newly renovated building reopened after an 8 year refurbishment, on 24 March 2021, a day before the 200th anniversary of the Greek War of Independence.

History
It was established in 1878 as a small collection of 117 works exhibited at the Athens University. In 1896, Alexandros Soutzos, a jurist and art lover, bequeathed his collection and estate to the Greek Government aspiring to the creation of an art museum. The museum opened in 1900 and the first curator was Georgios Jakobides, a famous Greek painter who was a member of the Munich School artistic movement. After World War II the works began for a new building. After relocating the sculptures in the new National Glyptotheque, there is a discussion to renovate the main building and to build a new wing.

Directors 

 Georgios Iakovidis (1900-1918)
 Zacharias Papantoniou (1918-1940)
 Georgios Stratigos (1940-1944)
 Dimitrios Evangelidis (1945-1947)
 Nikolaos Bertos (1947-1949)
 Marinos Kalligas (1949-1971)
 Andreas Ioannou (1971-1972)
 Dimitris Papastamos (1972-1989)
 Maria Michaelidou (1990-1991)
 Marina Lampraki-Plaka (1992-2022)
 Syrago Tsiara (2022- present)

Collections
The gallery exhibitions are mainly focused on post-Byzantine Greek Art. The gallery owns and exhibits also an extensive collection of European artists. Particularly valuable is the collection of paintings from the Renaissance.

Renaissance

 Joachim Beuckelaer Market Scene
 Jan Brueghel the Younger The Virgin in Paradise
 Jan Brueghel the Elder
 Dürer
 El Greco The Concert of the Angels, Christ on the Cross with the Two Maries and St John, Saint Peter
 Luca Giordano Esther and Ahasuerus
 Jacob Jordaens The Adoration of the Shepherds
 Zanino di Pietro Virgin with Child and Angels
 Jacopo del Sellaio Saint Jerome in the desert
 Giovanni Battista Tiepolo Eliezer and Rebecca, The Agony in the Garden
 Lorenzo Veneziano Crucifixion
 David Vinckeboons Wine Harvest

17th-20th century

 Ivan Aivazovsky Burning of the Turkish flagship
 Pieter Aertsen
 Jacob Beschey Moses Drawing Water from the Rock
 Braque
 Antoine Bourdelle
 Canaletto
 Raffaello Ceccoli
 Cecco del Caravaggio Youth with musical instruments
 Eugène Delacroix Mounted Greek Warrior
 Henri Fantin-Latour Still Life
 Jacques Linard Still Life
 Claude Lorrain
 Albert Marquet
 Henri Matisse
 Willem van Mieris Lady with the Parrot
 Piet Mondrian Landscape with a mill
 Antony Francis van der Meulen
 Francesco Pize
 Pablo Picasso Composition
 Piranesi
 Francis Picabia
 Rembrandt
 Auguste Rodin
 Peter Paul Rubens The Feast of the Epiphany, Adoration of the Shepherds
 Maurice Utrillo

Greek artists

 Ioannis Altamouras
 George Bouzianis
 Leonidas Drosis
 Nikos Engonopoulos
 Demetrios Farmakopoulos
 Alekos Fassianos
 Lazaros Fytalis
 Nikolaus Gysis
 Demetrios Galanis
 Theophilos Hatzimihail
 Nikos Hadjikyriakos-Ghikas
 Georgios Jakobides
 Nikos Kessanlis
 Ioannis Kossos
 Nikiphoros Lytras
 Polychronis Lempesis
 Konstantinos Maleas
 Yannis Moralis
 Dimitris Mytaras
 Theocharis Mores
 Nikos Nikolaou
 Pericles Pantazis
 Andreas Pavias
 Konstantinos Parthenis
 Yiannis Psychopedis
 Georgios Roilos
 Lucas Samaras
 Theodoros Stamos
 Panayiotis Tetsis
 Epameinondas Thomopoulos
 Yannis Tsarouchis
 Kostas Tsoklis
 Stephanos Tzangarolas
 Theodoros Vryzakis
 Spyros Vassiliou
 Konstantinos Volanakis
 Odysseas Phokas

Facts
Approximately four million people have visited the National Gallery in the last fourteen years. Its exhibition activity is mainly supported by sponsorships that cover up to half of its budget.
The National Gallery has opened the last years branches in Nafplion, Sparta and Corfu.

Visitor information
The gallery is situated on Vassilissis Sofias Avenue, opposite the Hilton Athens in Pangrati district. It can be reached with the Athens Metro at the Evangelismos station. It had been closed since March 2013 due to expansion works and reopened in March 2021. The National Glyptotheque is situated at the "Alsos Stratou" (Military Park) in Goudi, near Kanellopoulou Avenue and can be reached with the Athens Metro at the Katehaki station.

Gallery

See also

 Cretan School
 Foros Timis Ston Greco
 Greek art
 List of museums in Greece
 List of national galleries
 Modern Greek art
 National Glyptotheque

References

External links

 National Gallery of Athens Official website

Art museums and galleries in Greece
National museums of Greece
Museums in Athens
Art museums established in 1878
1878 establishments in Greece